

Events 
January 7 – Franz Liszt's Piano Concerto No. 2 receives its first public performance. Hans von Bronsart is the pianist with Liszt conducting, in Weimar.
January 21 – Giacomo Meyerbeer conducts a work by Mikhail Glinka, at a concert in Berlin attended by the composer. Glinka catches a cold and dies a few weeks later, aged 52; autopsy results are inconclusive.
January 27 – Franz Liszt's Sonata in B minor (Liszt) is given its first public performance by Hans von Bülow in Berlin.
February 7 – Louis Gottschalk leaves New York to begin a concert tour of Cuba.
March 14 – Stephen Foster sells all his copyrights to his music publisher for $1,872.28.
April 28 – Richard Wagner moves into Green Hill at Zürich, a villa owned by Otto Wesendonck.
July 4 – Georges Bizet wins the Prix de Rome.
August 27 – Joseph Joachim writes to Franz Liszt, ending their professional relationship.
October 8 – Irish opera diva Catherine Hayes marries her manager, William Avery Bushnell, in San Francisco; he dies less than a year later.
November 12 – 73-year-old Louis Spohr is forced into retirement from his post at the Hesse-Kassel court.
Gioacchino Rossini begins Péchés de vieillesse.
Hans von Bülow marries Cosima Liszt daughter of Franz Liszt.  They had two daughters.

Published popular music 
 "Le beau Monde (Fashionable Society)" m. Johann Strauss II
 "Does He Love Me?" w. Annie Chambers Bradford m. F. W. Smith
 "Jingle Bells w.m. James Pierpont originally published as "One Horse Open Sleigh"
 "Lorena" w. Reverend Henry D. L. Webster m. Joseph Philbrick Webster
 "Annie Lisle" w.m. H. S. Thompson

Classical music 
 Charles-Valentin Alkan
Sonate de Concert in E, Op. 47 for cello and piano
Douze études dans tous les tons mineurs Op. 39 for piano
Woldemar Bargiel – Ouvertüre zu einem Trauerspiel, Op.18
 Georges Bizet – Herminie (cantata)
 Adolphe Blanc 
 String Quintet No.3, Op.21
 String Quintet No.4, Op.22
 Trio in B♭ major for piano, violin (or clarinet) and cello, Op.23
Johannes Brahms
Serenade No 1, Op. 11
 Eleven Variations on an Original Theme, in D major Opus 21 No.1
Hans von Bülow – 5 Lieder, Op.5
Louise Farrenc – Trio no.4 for Flute, Cello, and Piano, Op.45
Wilhelm Kalliwoda – Scherzo, Op.4
 Franz Liszt
Dante Symphony
Hunnenschlacht (premiered on 29 December)
Die Ideale (premiered on 5 September)
Giacomo Meyerbeer –  Près de toi
 Modest Mussorgsky – Souvenir d'Enfance
 Joachim Raff
Ode to Spring: Concert Piece in G major, Op. 76, for piano and orchestra
String Quartet No. 2 in A major; Op. 90
Napoléon Henri Reber – Symphony No.4, Op.33
Julius Reubke – The 94th Psalm
 Bedřich Smetana – Piano Trio in G minor, Op. 15 (revised version – original finished 1855)
 Johann Strauss Jr. 
 Strelna-Terrassen-Quadrille, Op.185
 La Berceuse Quadrille, Op.194

Opera 
François Bazin – Maître Pathelin
Karel Miry – Karel V (opera in 5 acts, libretto by Hippoliet van Peene, premiered on January 29 in Ghent)
Jacques Offenbach – Croquefer, premiered February 12 in Paris
Ambroise Thomas – Le Carnaval de Venise
Giuseppe Verdi 
Simon Boccanegra, premiered March 12 in Venice
Aroldo, premiered August 16 in Rimini

Births 
 January 5 – David Bispham, opera singer (died 1921)
 January 17 – Wilhelm Kienzl, Austrian composer (died 1941)
 January 22 – Marie Krysińska, musician and composer (died 1908)
 February 28 – Gustave Kerker, German-born composer (died 1923)
 March 3 – Alfred Bruneau, French composer (died 1934)
 March 4
 Gustav Kobbé, American music critic and author (died 1918)
 Henry W. Petrie, American songwriter (died 1925)
 April 21 – Paul Dresser, American composer (died 1906)
 April 23 – Ruggiero Leoncavallo, Italian opera composer (died 1919)
 April 29 – František Ondříček, Czech violinist and composer (died 1922) 
 May 2 – Frederic Cliffe, English composer (died 1931)
May 9 – Luigi Illica, Italian librettist for Puccini, Catalani, Giordano and others (died 1919)
May 12 – Lillian Nordica, American opera singer (died 1914)
June 2 – Edward Elgar, English composer (died 1934)
June 5 – Árpád Doppler, Hungarian-German composer (died 1927)
June 12 – Achille Simonetti, violinist (died 1928)
July 8 – Rudolf Dellinger, composer (died 1910)
July 16 – Bolesław Domaniewski, pianist (died 1925)
August 8 – Cécile Chaminade, French composer (died 1944)
August 18 – Eusebius Mandyczewski, publisher and musician (died 1929)
September 8 – Olga Björkegren, Swedish opera singer (died 1950)
October 12 – Paul Lange, German musician, teacher, orchestra and choir leader (died 1919)
November 5 – Joseph Tabrar, English music hall songwriter (d. 1931)
November 14 – Rosalind Ellicott, English composer (died 1924)
December 14 – Frederic Lillebridge, pianist (died 1934)
December 18 – Rosa Newmarch, née Jeaffreson, English musicologist (died 1940)
December 27 – Charles Manners, né Southcote Mansergh, English operatic bass and opera company manager (died 1935)
December 30 – Sylvio Lazzari, Italian composer and conductor (died 1944)
date unknown – Thomas Adams, organist (died 1918)

Deaths 
January 19 – Franz Limmer, conductor and composer (b. 1808)
February 3 – Johann Gottlieb Kotte, musician (born 1797)
February 14 – Johannes Bernardus van Bree, violinist, conductor and composer (born 1801)
February 15 – Mikhail Glinka, composer (b. 1804)
March 1 – Benjamin Cross, organist, singer, conductor and composer (b. 1786)
April – Alessandro Curmi, pianist and composer (b. 1801)
June 28 – Joseph Fischhof, pianist, composer and music teacher (born 1804)
July 15 – Carl Czerny, pianist and composer (b. 1791)
July 16 – Pierre-Jean de Béranger, songwriter (b. 1780)
August 1 – Emilie Zumsteeg, pianist and songwriter (b. 1796)
September 18 – Karol Kurpiński, composer (born 1785)
October 20 – John Diamond, dancer (born 1823)
October 21 – Ananias Davisson, singing teacher and printer of shape note books (b. 1780)
November 7 – Charles Zeuner, organist (born 1795)
December 11 – Castil-Blaze, music critic, musicologist and composer (b. 1784)
probable – Ferdinand Prévôt, operatic baritone (born c.1800)

References 

 
19th century in music
Music by year